The sooty darter (Etheostoma olivaceum) is a species of freshwater ray-finned fish, a darter from the subfamily Etheostomatinae, part of the family Percidae, which also contains the perches, ruffes and pikeperches. It is endemic the eastern United States. It is found in the Cumberland River basin where it is found only in the lower portion of the Caney Fork system and nearby tributaries in central Tennessee. It inhabits streams and creeks occurring in pools and their nearby riffles.

References

Etheostoma
Taxa named by Marvin Eugene Braasch
Taxa named by Lawrence M. Page
Fish described in 1979